The Upper East Side Historic District is a landmarked historic district on the Upper East Side of New York City's borough of Manhattan, first designated by the city in 1981. It was listed on the National Register of Historic Places in 1984. Its boundaries were expanded in 2010.

The district includes all of the Fifth Avenue properties bordering Central Park from 59th to 78th Street; both sides of Madison Avenue from 61st Street to 77th Street; both sides of Park Avenue from just below 62nd street to 72nd Street; and portions of both sides of Lexington Avenue from 63rd Street to 75th Street.

The district is home to a number of buildings individually listed on the National Register, including the Gertrude Rhinelander Waldo Mansion and the Sara Delano Roosevelt Memorial House, as well as edifices that are more recent additions like the Edmond J. Safra Synagogue — a 2003 building designed in an "artful synthesis of the composition, details and material palette of the Beaux-Arts style," to complement the historic buildings that surround it.

References

External links 

Upper East Side
Historic districts on the National Register of Historic Places in Manhattan
Historic districts in Manhattan
New York City Designated Landmarks in Manhattan
New York City designated historic districts